Intrepid was launched in Newcastle upon Tyne in 1809. She then became a transport. In 1820 she made a voyage to Bengal, sailing under a license from the British East India Company (EIC). She then reverted to being a transport. She was wrecked on 5 January 1826.

Career
Intrepid was registered in Whitby in June 1809. She first appeared in Lloyd's Register (LR) in 1811.

On 25 October 1816 Intrepid put into Sheerness. She had been on her way from Woolwich to Barbados with troops when a colliere brig had run into her, carrying away Intrepids bowsprit and jib-boom.

Intrepid was sold to London in 1817.

In 1813 the EIC had lost its monopoly on the trade between India and Britain. British ships were then free to sail to India or the Indian Ocean under a license from the EIC.

Intrepid sailed for Bengal on 20 January 1820 under a license from the EIC.

Fate
On 5 January 1826 Intrepid, Metcalf, master, was driven on shore near Skerries, Dublin. The violence of the gale resulted in her going to pieces on 6 January. She had been on a voyage from Alexandria to Liverpool.

Notes, citations, and references
Notes

Citations

References
 
 

1809 ships
Age of Sail merchant ships of England
Maritime incidents in January 1826